Soudthichak's bent-toed gecko (Cyrtodactylus soudthichaki) is a species of lizard in the family Gekkonidae. The species is endemic to Laos.

Etymology
The specific name, soudthichaki, is in honor of Laotian conservationist Sisomphone Soudthichak.

Geographic range
C. soudthichaki is found in central Laos, in Khammouane Province.

Habitat

Description

Reproduction
The mode of reproduction of C. soudthichaki is unknown.

References

Further reading
Luu VQ, Calame T, Nguyen TQ, Bonkowski M, Ziegler T (2015). "A new species of Cyrtodactylus (Squamata: Gekkonidae) from the limestone forest of Khammouane Province, central Laos". Zootaxa 4058 (3): 388–402. (Cyrtodactylus soudthichaki, new species).

Cyrtodactylus
Reptiles described in 2015
Endemic fauna of Laos
Reptiles of Laos